Nationality words link to articles with information on the nation's poetry or literature (for instance, Irish or France).

Events

Works published

Great Britain
 Francis Quarles, Solomon's Recantation, entitled Ecclesiastes Paraphrased
 Sir Robert Stapylton, translator, Erotopagnion, translated from the original Latin of the Musaeus
 Edmund Waller, Poems
 George Wither, Vox Pacifica: A Voice Tending to the Pacification of God's Wrath

Other
 Adrián de Alesio, El Angélico ("The Angel"), dedicated to Saint Thomas Aquinas
 Sheikh Muhammad, Yoga-samgrama

Works incorrectly dated this year
 John Milton, Poems of Mr John Milton, Both English and Latin, published 1646, according to The Concise Oxford Chronology of English Literature, notwithstanding the book's title page

Births
Death years link to the corresponding "[year] in poetry" article:
 April 11 – Juan del Valle y Caviedes (died 1697), Spanish-born Peruvian poet and author

Deaths
Birth years link to the corresponding "[year] in poetry" article:
 March 10 – William Strode (born c.1602), English poet
 April 3 (bur.) – Emilia Lanier, also spelled "Aemilia Lanyer" (born 1569), English
 July 7 – Georg Friedrich of Hohenlohe-Neuenstein-Weikersheim (born 1569), German officer and poet
 July 13 – Marie de Gournay, also known as Marie le Jars, demoiselle de Gournay (born c. 1566), French writer, author of feminist tracts and poet; a close associate of Michel de Montaigne; buried in the Saint-Eustache Church in Paris
 August 28 – Hugo Grotius (born 1583), Dutch jurist, philosopher, theologian, Christian apologist, playwright and poet
 August 31 – Francesco Bracciolini (born 1566), Italian
 September 8 – Francisco de Quevedo (born 1580), Spanish nobleman, politician and Golden Age poet
 William Browne (born 1590), English pastoral poet
 Feng Menglong (born 1574), Chinese writer and poet

See also

Poetry
 17th century in poetry
 17th century in literature
 Cavalier poets in England, who supported the monarch against the puritans in the English Civil War

Notes

17th-century poetry
Poetry